Dragon's Dogma is an original net animation (ONA) anime dark fantasy series based on the 2012 video game of the same name by Capcom. Directed by Shinya Sugai, the series was released worldwide on September 17, 2020 on Netflix.

Characters

Production
The series is animated by Sublimation. Shinya Sugai serves as director and executive producer; Taiki Sakurai as executive producer, with Capcom's Takashi Kitahara and Hiroyuki Kobayashi as executive co-producers. Kurasumi Sunayama is writing the scripts, and Kaoru Nishimura designing the characters. The series is listed for seven episodes. Original game composer Tadayoshi Makino serves as the show's composer.

Episodes

Reception
On review aggregator website Rotten Tomatoes, the first season holds an approval rating of 83% based on 6 reviews from critics while views gave it an approval rating of 40%.

In a positive review, IGN's David Jagneaux wrote, "It's not the best video game adaptation ever—Castlevania is absolutely winning that race—but it's a good debut that has room for growth with (hopefully) future seasons."
Writing for The A.V. Club, Sam Barsanti called the first season, "a fun, if forgettable video game adaptation."
The Escapist's Jesse Lab responded more negatively to the first season, lamenting it as "a heartbreaking disappointment."

References

External links
 
 
 

2020 anime ONAs
Adventure anime and manga
Anime based on video games
Dark fantasy anime and manga
English-language Netflix original programming
Netflix original anime
Seven deadly sins in popular culture
Works based on Capcom video games